Babm (pronounced ) is an international auxiliary language created by the Japanese philosopher Rikichi [Fuishiki] Okamoto (1885–1963). Okamoto first published the language in his 1962 book, The Simplest Universal Auxiliary Language Babm, but the language has not caught on even within the constructed language community, and does not have any known current speakers. The language uses the Latin script as a syllabary, and possesses no articles or auxiliary verbs. Each letter marks an entire syllable rather than a single phoneme. Babm follows a sound-based rule set, which Okamoto outlines in his book. He states "Nouns are coined from three consonants and one vowel, verbs from one or two vowels between two consonants at the beginning and at the end. Adjectives, adverbs, pronouns, numerals, and propositions have respectively their own peculiar form." 

The language has in common with some 17th-century artificial languages an over-riding concern with taxonomy, and providing a universally consistent set of names for chemicals, etc.; the author's "scientific" preoccupation is a contrast to the socio-political mandate of Esperanto, although the 1962 book is certainly not lacking in statements about world peace. Okamoto hoped this "simple" language would become universally useful.

Phonology and orthography 
Every consonant in Babm must be followed by a particular short vowel, with the exception of /k/ which can be followed by any vowel. Vowels that are attached to nouns are short vowels by default, and those not attached to nouns are long, but vowel length can be modified. Because of this, words have a basic CV structure with some vowel clusters but no consonant clusters.

Babm uses the Latin alphabet with 26 letters. Each letter of the alphabet represents said letter plus a short vowel. Written vowels represent long vowels. The consonant and vowel inventories are as follows (for the value of the signs, see International Phonetic Alphabet):

Syntax 
Okamoto provides limited information about the syntax, stating that "it is rather desirable that it [the sentence] be free from many rules of composition." The word order is SVO, with modifiers preceding the elements they modify.

The language exhibits some degree of analytic inflection: In sentences with complex structures, the subject, the direct object, and the indirect object can be distinguished through preceding "prepositional conjunctions." There is also a set of auxiliary-like elements that Okamoto terms "executive complements," which modify the verb in various ways and may occur either as suffixes or as separate words preceding the verb.

Semantics 
Okamoto's book provides a detailed dictionary, split up into a number of sections. In his text, Okamoto splits nouns up into nine sections: "Living Things", "Material Bodies", "Chemical Terms", "Expendables and Materials", "Durable Goods", "Human Body and Physiology", "Conscious Actions", "Structure of Living", and "Politics". Each of these sections is split into a number of sub-sections. The other parts of speech further split into smaller sections in the book are "Verbs", "Complements" and "Prepositional Conjunctions". Okamoto also includes a section for "Abridged Common Expressions" such as "Good evening!" and "Congratulations!"

Morphology 
In order to keep the language simple, Babm does not have articles or auxiliary verbs, and avoids the inflection of a basic word.

Nouns 
As a rule, 4 letters make up a noun. Nouns have an initial short-sound letter which indicates meaning, usually followed by a long-sound letter which is pronounced long and with a strong accent. The third letter is also usually short-sound, and it indicates the sort of noun divided by meaning, although it can be long-sound as well. The final letter is also short-sound, and it specifies the noun. If a noun has two long-sound letters in the middle, the first is accentuated. Proper nouns should follow these guidelines, however one long-sound or one short-sound letter may be added before or after the word. c, lr, and qw are not permitted to be noun-initial, and l and w are avoided at the end of nouns. 

Verbs 
Verbs have either 3 or 4 letters. They must start with a short-sound letter which indicates meaning and end with a short-sound letter. There can be one or two long-sound letters in the middle. One long-sound letter and the final short-sound letter correspond with their similar-sounding noun counterpart. On rare occasions, verbs may have three long-sound letters. The first long-sound letter and the third long-sound letter (if present) are accentually pronounced and the final short-sound letter is pronounced slightly strongly and distinctly. 

Example: bean

Complements 
Complements have less than three letters and are conducted by c. The complement is an adjective when modifying a noun or pronoun and an adverb when qualifying any other word. The suffix -w may also be added to adverbs to make it clearer. They generally end with a short-sound letter. l and w are avoided at the end of complements. Example:  (white)

Pronouns 
Pronouns have four classes: personal pronoun, impersonal pronoun, relative pronoun, and interrogative pronoun. 

Personal and impersonal pronouns:

Relative pronouns are based on lr, and interrogative pronouns are based on qw. Both of these are used as the subject or object. The beginning short-sound letter and the first long-sound letter are accented, and other long-sound letters are pronounced somewhat strongly and distinctly with a pause.

Prepositional conjunctions 
The prepositional conjunction is one letter, a. It usually accompanies one or two long-sound letters before or after one short-sound letter and may be placed before any word, clause, or sentence.

Exclamations 
Exclamations are two long-sounding letters and w may be added to the middle or end.

Affixes 
Babm utilizes prefixes and suffixes to modify nouns, verbs, complements, and pronouns.

Examples

[Babm:]  

[IPA:] 

[English:] I am reading this book, which is very interestingly written in Babm by a predominant scholar.

[Babm:] 

[IPA:] 

[English:] Time causes youth to be old.

References

Bibliography
Okamoto, Rikichi [Fuishiki] (1962). Universal auxiliary language, Babm. Tokyo: The author. [Author appears as Fuishiki Okamoto.]
Okamoto, Rikichi [Fuishiki] (1964). Sekaigogakuron. Tokyo: Minseikan. [In Japanese.]

External links
  Babm: The Simplest Auxiliary Language (excerpts from the 1962 book)
 "Babm and Lin" by Ray Brown
 The first 25 pages of Universal Auxiliary Language Babm

Constructed languages introduced in 1962
International auxiliary languages
Constructed languages
Languages of Japan